Micromacromia camerunica is a species of dragonfly in the family Libellulidae. It is found in Cameroon, the Democratic Republic of the Congo, Ivory Coast, Equatorial Guinea, Guinea, Kenya, Liberia, Nigeria, Sierra Leone, and Uganda. Its natural habitats are subtropical or tropical moist lowland forests and rivers.

References

Libellulidae
Taxonomy articles created by Polbot
Insects described in 1890